Panipuri (originally known as jalapatra from Mahabharata times), fuchka, phuchka, gupchup, golgappa, or pani ke patashe is a type of snack originating in the Indian subcontinent, where it is an extremely common street food.

Ingredients 
Panipuri consists of a round hollow puri (a deep-fried crisp flatbread), filled with a mixture of flavored water (known as imli pani), tamarind chutney, chili powder, chaat masala, potato mash, onion, or chickpeas.

Fuchka (or fuska or puska) differs from panipuri in content and taste. It uses spiced mashed potatoes as the filling. It is tangy rather than sweetish while the water is sour and spicy.

Names 

Panipuri's name varies depending on the region. In Maharashtra, it is known as Pani Puri; Haryana it is known as paani patashi; in Madhya Pradesh fulki; in Uttar Pradesh pani ke batashe/padake ; in Assam phuska/puska; Pakodi in parts of Gujarat, Gup-chup in Odisha, Andhra Pradesh, South Jharkhand, Chhattisgarh Phuchka in Bengal, Bihar and Nepal. It is popular by the name of Gol Gappa (/goːl.gapːaː/) in some parts of Northern India (particularly Delhi and Punjab) and Pakistan.

On 10 March 2005, "pani puri" was added to the Oxford English Dictionary.

History 
Chaat is considered the predecessor of pani puri/ gol gappa. According to the culinary anthropologist Kurush Dalal, chaat originated in Northern Indian region of what is now Uttar Pradesh. Gol gappa originated In Indian subcontinent. He also noted that it possibly originated from Raj-Kachori: an accidentally-made smaller puri giving birth to pani puri. Pani puri spread to the rest of India mainly due to migration of people from one part of the country to another in the 20th century.

Panipuri's origin can be traced back to ancient times. Many historians believe that panipuri has its roots in the Mughal era, while other argue that it was made in the Hindu temples, where it was used as an offering to the gods. Regardless of its origins, the dish became popular in the Northern regions of India during the early 20th century (it reportedly existed prior to 600 BCE), and it quickly spread to other parts of the country. It is argued that it originated from the Indian Kingdom of Magadha. This location of this Kingdom is now known as Southern Bihar.

Mythological history 
Panipuri has a mythological aspect to it too. The legend can be traced back to the holy Hindu book of 'Mahabharata'. In the legend, when the newly wedded Draupadi came home, her mother in law Kunti gave her a task. As they were living in exile, they had to make do everyday with very scare resources. In order to test if her new daughter in law, Draupadi, is fit for the family she wanted to see if she will be able to manage and live in harmony with the family with limited resources. Her challenge was to make food that would satisfy the hunger of all of her sons. So Kunti gave some left over vegetables and enough dough to make one puri (type of Indian bread). This is when Draupadi created one of the first versions of panipuri, golgappa. Kunti was also so happy with the dish that she blessed the dish with immortality.

Evolution over time 

Panipuri has evolved significantly over time. Originally known as "gol gappa," the dish consisted of a small, hollow, fried wheat shell filled with spiced mashed potatoes and served with a tamarind or mint-flavored water. Over time, variations of the filling and the flavored water emerged, reflecting the regional preferences and availability of ingredients. The flavored water, also known as the "pani," is an essential component of the dish and is often the main source of flavor. Some of the most popular flavors of panipuri include the traditional tamarind and mint water, as well as spicy variations like jalapeno or green chili water, and tangy flavors like lemon or tomato water. Some regional variations also use sweet flavors like fruit juices or dates. Panipuri is served with a range of fillings such as chickpeas, onions, and sprouts, and the flavored water can be made with a variety of ingredients such as lemon juice, jalapeno peppers, and fruit juices. The dish has also become more accessible, with pre-packaged panipuri shells and ready-to-use flavored water available in grocery stores. Panipuri is also known to be a byproduct of an older dish called phulki.

Gallery

See also
 Bhelpuri
 Chotpoti
 Dahi puri
 Sev puri
 Pholourie

References

Bangladeshi snack foods
Bengali cuisine
Deep fried foods
Indian fast food
Indian wheat dishes
Nepalese cuisine
Street food
Pakistani snack foods